Jayden Roy Onen (born 17 February 2001) is an English professional footballer who plays as an attacking midfielder for USL League One club Forward Madison. He is a product of the Arsenal, Crystal Palace, Brighton & Hove Albion and Brentford academies.

Club career

Youth years 
An attacking midfielder, Onen began his career in the Arsenal academy, before joining Crystal Palace on a scholarship deal in 2017. He remained at Selhurst Park until December 2017, when he joined the Brighton & Hove Albion academy as a scholar. Onen made one EFL Trophy appearance for Albion's U21 team during the 2018–19 season, before his release in December 2018.

Brentford 
On 17 December 2018, Onen transferred to the B team at Championship club Brentford on an 18-month contract. He made 30 appearances and scored three goals for the B team prior to his release at the end of the 2019–20 season. A one-month loan at National League club Bromley in late 2019 yielded just one injury time substitute appearance.

Reading 
On 6 November 2020, after a successful trial period, Onen joined the U23 team at Championship club Reading on a contract running until the end of the 2020–21 season. During the remainder of the season, he was an unused substitute for the first team on 16 occasions and made two appearances prior to the expiration of his contract.

Sheffield Wednesday
Following a trial spell, Onen signed a contract running until the end of the 2021–22 season with the U23 team at League One club Sheffield Wednesday. He failed to win a call into a first team matchday squad and was released when his contract expired.

Forward Madison 
On 17 January 2023, Onen signed a contract to play the 2023 season with USL League One club Forward Madison.

International career 
Onen was called up to the Uganda squad for two 2021 Africa Cup of Nations qualifiers in March 2020, which were later postponed. He participated in a training camp in Dubai in October 2020.

Personal life 
Onen is of Ugandan descent. In July 2020, it was reported that FUFA were trying to arrange dual-citizenship with Uganda for Onen.

Career statistics

References

External links 
 
 Jayden Onen at premierleague.com

2001 births
Living people
Footballers from Edmonton, London
English footballers
English people of Ugandan descent
Brentford F.C. players
Association football midfielders
English Football League players
USL League One players
Arsenal F.C. players
Crystal Palace F.C. players
Brighton & Hove Albion F.C. players
Bromley F.C. players
Reading F.C. players
Sheffield Wednesday F.C. players
Forward Madison FC players
English expatriate footballers
Expatriate soccer players in the United States
English expatriate sportspeople in the United States